Gobble Hollow is a valley in eastern St. Francois County in the U.S. state of Missouri. It is a tributary to the Little Saint Francois River.

Gobble Hollow was so named due to the presence of wild turkeys in the valley.

References

Valleys of St. Francois County, Missouri
Valleys of Missouri